Branislav Jankovič (born 11 April 1991) is a Slovak former professional ice hockey player. He played in the Czech Extraliga with HC Kometa Brno and in the Slovak Extraliga for HC '05 Banská Bystrica and HK 36 Skalica.

References

External links

1991 births
Living people
HC '05 Banská Bystrica players
BK Havlíčkův Brod players
HC Kometa Brno players
MHk 32 Liptovský Mikuláš players
HK 36 Skalica players
Slovak ice hockey forwards
Sportspeople from Trnava
Slovak expatriate ice hockey players in the Czech Republic
Slovak expatriate ice hockey players in Canada